The Plunderer is a 1924 American silent Western film directed by George Archainbaud and starring Frank Mayo and Evelyn Brent. An earlier version filmed in 1920 starred William Farnum. The film is considered to be lost.

Plot
As described in a film magazine review, Richard Townsend goes West to develop his heritage, the unproductive Croix D'or gold mine. He and Bill Matthews, his trusty foreman, discover that the  mine is being plundered of its gold by Bill Presbey, the owner of the adjacent claim and father of Joan. Richard loves Joan, and Matthews is in love with The Lily, the fair proprietor of the mining town honky-tonk. After several exciting episodes that include fights, a strike, the dynamiting of a dam, a fire, and a mine cave-in, love and virtue triumph. Presbey succumbs to his daughter's plea plus Matthews' fists and returns the stolen gold. The Lily reforms and everything points to happiness ever after for her and Bill as well as for Richard and Joan.

Cast

References

External links

 
 

1924 films
1924 lost films
1924 Western (genre) films
American black-and-white films
Films directed by George Archainbaud
Fox Film films
Lost Western (genre) films
Lost American films
Silent American Western (genre) films
1920s American films